Tomida femina ("A swollen woman") is the earliest surviving poem in Occitan, a sixteen-line charm probably for the use of midwives. It is preserved in the left and bottom margins of a Latin legal treatise in a ninth- or tenth-century manuscript, where it is written upside down. Line 14 is missing, but has been supplied by the editors on the basis of the pattern of the final three lines. It has been edited and translated into English by William Doremus Paden and Frances Freeman Paden:

The meaning of the poetic charm, a "talking cure", is uncertain. Possibly it is intended as a cure for an edema. The swollen woman of line 1 and the swollen child of line 3 may both be patients, or perhaps only one of them. The charm transfers the swelling from the patient to wood and iron, possibly referring to medical instruments, and thence to the earth. On the other hand, the swollen woman and child "held in her lap" may refer to a pregnancy. The chanter may be the midwife. The poem's editors note the fittingness of an image of birth at the beginning of Occitan literature.

Notes

Sources
W. D. Paden and F. F. Paden. 2007. Troubadour Poems from the South of France. Cambridge: D. S. Brewer, pp. 14–16.

Occitan literature
Medieval literature
Medical literature